William Paul Killeen (8 July 1903 – 1 March 1991) was an Australian rules footballer who played with Fitzroy in the Victorian Football League (VFL).

Notes

External links 

1903 births
1991 deaths
Australian rules footballers from Victoria (Australia)
Fitzroy Football Club players
Maryborough Football Club players